Mayodan is a town in Rockingham County, North Carolina, in the United States. It is a manufacturing site for Sturm, Ruger & Co., Bridgestone Aircraft Tire, and General Tobacco (ceased operations 2010). Washington Mills Company, later Tultex, operated a textile mill in Mayodan until 1999.
 
The town is named for two rivers that converge nearby, the Mayo and the  Dan, and, according to Ripley's Believe It or Not!, is the only town in the world with this name.

History
Mayodan started as a mill town when a cotton mill was built in 1892. Operations began in April 1896.
The Washington Mills-Mayodan Plant was listed on the National Register of Historic Places in 2005.

Geography
Mayodan is located at  (36.414089, -79.970849).

Mayodan is located near the confluence of the Mayo and Dan Rivers.

Schools
High Schools: Dalton L. McMichael High School
Middle Schools: Western Rockingham Middle School

Demographics

2020 census

As of the 2020 United States census, there were 2,418 people, 1,170 households, and 671 families residing in the town.

2010 census
As of the census of 2010, there were 2,478 people, 1,173 households, and 651 families residing in the town. The population density was 1,608.8 people per square mile (622.1/km). There were 1,268 housing units at an average density of 844.0 per square mile (326.4/km). The racial makeup of the town was 85.85% White, 10.38% African American, 0.17% Native American, 0.21% Asian, 2.57% from other races, and 0.83% from two or more races. Hispanic or Latino of any race were 4.01% of the population.

There were 1,173 households, out of which 21.4% had children under the age of 18 living with them; 38.6% were married couples living together; 13.3% had a female householder with no husband present; and 44.5% were non-families. 41.4% of all households were made up of individuals, and 21.2% had someone living alone who was 65 years of age or older. The average household size was 2.06 and the average family size was 2.78 people.

The population's age distribution was broad: 19.3% under the age of 18, 7.4% from 18 to 24, 27.5% from 25 to 44, 23.4% from 45 to 64, and 22.4% who were 65 years of age or older. The median age was 43 years. For every 100 females, there were 82.3 males. For every 100 females age 18 and over, there were 79.7 males.

The median income for a household in Mayodan was $25,980, and the median income for a family was $36,328. Males had a median income of $25,878 versus $21,250 for females. The per capita income for the town was $15,607. 16.0% of the population and 11.3% of families were below the poverty line. 20.5% of those under the age of 18 and 17.9% of those 65 and older were living below the poverty line.

Notable residents 
 Benny Carter (1943–2014) - painter
 Frankie Blankenship (2015-2017) - Backyard WRESTLER

References

External links
 Official website
 The Madison Messenger, the area's community newspaper

Towns in Rockingham County, North Carolina
Towns in North Carolina